Samaa Ahmed (born 22 July 1998) is an Egyptian canoeist. She competed in the women's K-1 200 metres and the K-1 500 metres  events at the 2020 Summer Olympics.

References

External links
 

1998 births
Living people
Egyptian female canoeists
Canoeists at the 2020 Summer Olympics
Olympic canoeists of Egypt
Competitors at the 2019 African Games
African Games silver medalists for Egypt
African Games bronze medalists for Egypt
African Games medalists in canoeing
21st-century Egyptian women
20th-century Egyptian women